Yongzhou, formerly known as Lingling, is a prefecture-level city in the south of Hunan province, People's Republic of China, located on the southern bank of the Xiang River, which is formed by the confluence of the Xiao and Xiang Rivers, and bordering Guangdong to the southeast and Guangxi to the southwest. With a history of 2000 years, Yongzhou is one of the four ancient counties in Hunan.

History

During late imperial China, Yongzhou was also the seat of a prefecture.

Geography and climate
Yongzhou is the southernmost prefecture-level division of Hunan, and is located at the confluence of the Xiao (Xiaoshui) and Xiang Rivers. Within its borders is the Nan Mountains (Nan Ling), which increases the complexity of climatic variation. It borders Chenzhou to the east, Hezhou (Guangxi), Guilin (Guangxi) and Qingyuan (Guangdong) to the south, and Hengyang and Shaoyang to the north.

Winters are mild and brief, beginning somewhat dry and turning wet and gloomy as the season progresses. Spring is very rainy, especially in May, which is the wettest month. Summer is very hot and humid, with moderate levels of rain, and generous sunshine; on average, July and August are the only two months where the area receives more than half of possible sunshine. Autumn is the driest season. From January to May, on average, more than half of the days each month receive some precipitation. With monthly percent possible sunshine ranging from 15% in February and March to 58% in July, the city receives 1,491 hours of sunshine annually.

Administrative divisions
Lengshuitan District
Lingling District
Qiyang City
Dong'an County
Dao County
Ningyuan County
Jiangyong County
Lanshan County
Xintian County
Shuangpai County
Jianghua Yao Autonomous County

Government

The current CPC Party Secretary of Yongzhou is Li Hui and the current Mayor is Zhu Hongwu.

Transportation

Air
Yongzhou Lingling Airport

Rail
 Hunan–Guangxi Railway

Highway
China National Highway 207

Notable citizens

Yongzhou is the home of supermodel Liu Wen and political dissident Tang Baiqiao.

Sister cities

Courthouse incident
Three judges were killed and three court staff were injured by submachine gun in the 2010 Yongzhou courthouse shooting. The assailant was apparently angry at the Chinese justice system about the results of his divorce settlement.

External links

Official website of Yongzhou Government

References

 
Prefecture-level divisions of Hunan
Cities in Hunan